Orphan, orphaned or abandoned wells are oil or gas wells that have been abandoned by fossil fuel extraction industries. These wells may have been deactivated because of economic viability, failure to transfer ownerships (especially at bankruptcy of companies), or neglect and thus no longer have legal owners responsible for their care. Decommissioning wells effectively can be expensive, costing millions of dollars, and economic incentives for businesses generally encourage abandonment. This process leaves the wells the burden of  government agencies or landowners when a business entity can no longer be held responsible. As climate change mitigation reduces demand and usage of oil and gas, its expected that more wells will be abandoned as stranded assets.

Orphan wells are an important contributor of greenhouse gas emissions causing climate change. Wells are an important source of methane emissions through leakage through plugs, or failure to plug properly. A 2020 estimate of US abandoned wells alone was that methane emissions released from abandoned wells produced greenhouse gas impacts equivalent of 3 weeks US oil consumption each year. The scale of leaking abandoned wells are well understood in the US and Canada because of public data and regulation; however, a Reuters investigation in 2020 could not find good estimates for Russia, Saudi Arabia and China—the next biggest oil and gas producers. However, they estimate there are 29 million abandoned wells internationally.

Abandoned wells also have the potential to contaminate land, air and water around wells, potentially harming ecosystems, wildlife, livestock, and humans. For example, many wells in the United States are situated on farmland, and if not maintained could contaminate important sources of soil and groundwater with toxic contaminants.

Economic limits 
A well is said to reach an "economic limit" when its most efficient production rate does not cover the operating expenses, including taxes. When the economic limit is raised, the life of the well is shortened and proven oil reserves are lost. Conversely, when the economic limit is lowered, the life of the well is lengthened. When the economic limit is reached, the well becomes a liability and is abandoned.

At the economic limit there often is still a significant amount of unrecoverable oil left in the reservoir. It might be tempting to defer physical abandonment for an extended period of time, hoping that the oil price will go up or that new supplemental recovery techniques will be perfected. In these cases, temporary plugs will be placed downhole and locks will be attached to the wellhead to prevent tampering. There are thousands of "abandoned" wells throughout North America, waiting to see what the market will do before permanent abandonment. Often, lease provisions and governmental regulations usually require quick abandonment; liability and tax concerns also may favor abandonment.

In theory, an abandoned well can be reinstated and re-entered to production (or converted to injection service for supplemental recovery or for downhole hydrocarbon storage), but reentry often proves to be difficult mechanically and expensive. Traditionally elastomer and cement plugs have been used with varying degrees of success and reliability. Over time, they may deteriorate, particularly in corrosive environments, due to the materials from which they are manufactured. New tools have been developed that make re-entry easier, these tools offer higher expansion ratios than conventional bridge plugs and higher differential pressure ratings than inflatable packers, all while providing a V0 rated, gas-tight seal that cement cannot provide.

Reclaim and reuse 
Some abandoned wells are subsequently plugged and the site is reclaimed; however, the cost of such efforts can be in the millions of dollars. In this process, tubing is removed from the well, and sections of wellbore are filled with concrete to isolate the flow path between gas and water zones from each other, as well as the surface. The surface around the wellhead is then excavated, and the wellhead and casing are cut off, a cap is welded in place and then buried.

Plugging 
The main method of plugging wells is through elastomer and cement plugs. Government-led campaigns to plug wells are expensive but often facilitated by oil and gas taxes, bonds, or other fees applied to production. Environmental non-profit organizations, such as the Well Done Foundation, also carry out well-plugging projects and develop programs alongside government entities.

CO2 injection 

Unused wells, especially from natural gas might be used for carbon capture or storage. However, if not sealed properly, or the storage site is not sufficiently sealed, there is a possibility of leakage.

Geothermal generation 
A 2014 study in China evaluated the use of oil wells for geothermal power generation. A similar study followed in 2019 for natural gas wells.

Environmental impacts

Hydraulic fracturing 

Hydraulic fracturing, also known as fracking, is the process of fracturing bedrock with pressurized liquids. This process creates cracks in well-formed rock formations to allow natural gas, petroleum, and brine to move more effortlessly. When hydraulic fracturing is done in nearby geographies to an orphaned well it can cause breaches of poorly sealed or unsealed abandoned wells further contaminating local ecosystems. These orphaned wells can allow gas and oil to contaminate groundwater due to improper sealing.

By context

Alberta, Canada

United States

Notes

References 

Oil wells